Loos is a Dutch and Low German surname. It can be of toponymic, patronymic or descriptive origin. In the Low Countries, Lo/Loos was a short form of Lodewijk (akin to Louis)  while in North Germany the name may be derived from Nikolaus. People with this surname include:

Art 
 Adolf Loos (1870–1933), Austrian architect
 Anita Loos (1888–1981), American screen writer and author
 Anna Loos (born 1970), German actress and singer
 Charles Loos (born 1951), Belgian jazz pianist and composer
 Friedrich Loos (1797–1890), Austrian painter, etcher and lithographer
 Mary Loos (1910–2004), American actress
 Theodor Loos (1883–1954), German actor

Sports 
 Dave Loos (born 1947), American basketball coach and athletic director
 Eddie Loos (1893–1950), American golfer
 Georg Loos (born 1943), German racing driver
 Josef Loos (1888–1955), Czech ice hockey player
 Ludo Loos (born 1955), Belgian road bicycle racer
 Michelle Loos, New Zealand footballer
 Pete Loos (1878–1956), American baseball pitcher
 Vilém Loos (1895–1942), Czechoslovakian ice hockey player
 Walter Loos (born 1955), German footballer

Other 
 Bernhard Loos (born 1955), German politician
 Cornelius Loos (1546–1595), Dutch Catholic priest and theologian
 Cornelius Loos (1686–1738), Swedish military engineer and explorer
 François Loos (born 1953), French diplomat
 Gerhard Loos (1916–1944), German Luftwaffe fighter ace
 Jan Frans Loos (1799–1871), Belgian liberal politician
 John L. Loos (1918–2011), American historian
 Jos Loos
 R. Beers Loos (1860–1944), American journalist and newspaper publisher
 Rebecca Loos (born 1977), Dutch-Spanish model and media personality
 Wilhelm Loos (1911–1988), German World War II army officer
 Wolfgang Loos (born 1955), German Luftwaffe fighter ace

See also
 Loos for places called Loos
 Loos Memorial near Loos-en-Gohelle in French Flanders
 Loos & Co., American wire and cable manufacturer founded by August Loos
 Van Gend & Loos, Dutch distribution company founded in 1809 by a merger of Jan-Baptist van Gend's and Petrus Josephus Loos's companies
 Ross-Loos Medical Group founded in 1929 by Donald E. Ross and H. Clifford Loos (brother of Anita Loos)

Dutch-language surnames
German-language surnames
Patronymic surnames
Surnames from given names